Sane was an ancient Greek city in Pallene headland of Chalcidice. It is located between Mende and Potidaea. The city was a member of the Delian League. It is mentioned by Herodotus in connection with the march of Xerxes I in Thrace.

References 

Cities in ancient Macedonia
Populated places in ancient Macedonia
Greek colonies in Chalcidice
Members of the Delian League
Former populated places in Greece